Crabbing is short for crab fishing.

It may also refer to:

 Decatising, a process in textile production
 Deviation between bearing and direction of travel in an aircraft attempting a crosswind landing
 The action of crab cavities, rotating particle bunches in accelerators out of alignment with their direction of travel